Gardiner Historic District and variations may refer to:

Gardiner Historic District (Gardiner, Maine)
Gardiner Historic District (Gardiner, Oregon)
Gardiner Place Historic District, Walton, New York
Smith–Gardiner–Norman Farm Historic District, Middletown, Rhode Island